Feng Shui is the fourth studio album by Doldrums, released on April 18, 2000 by VHF Records.

Track listing

Personnel 
Adapted from Feng Shui liner notes.
Doldrums
Justin Chearno – guitar, engineering
Bill Kellum – bass guitar, engineering
Matt Kellum – drums, engineering

Release history

References

External links 
 Feng Shui at Discogs (list of releases)

2000 albums
Doldrums (band) albums
VHF Records albums